is a Japanese writer on photography, and photographer.

Born in Onomichi, Hiroshima, on 1 January 1936, Matsumoto graduated from Nihon University in 1958. He started to work for the publishing company  while still a student, but went freelance in 1963, mostly working for corporate and other magazines. From 1964 his photography was mainly of the theatre.

Matsumoto has published numerous books about the history of Japanese photography.

Eighteen prints by Matsumoto are in the collection of the Tokyo Photographic Art Museum.

Books by Matsumoto
 Mizutani Yaeko 1974–1979. Tokyo: Heibonsha, 1980. Photographs by Matsumoto.
 Kamera o hajimeru hito no tame ni. Tokyo: Ikeda Shoten, 1984.
 Shōwa o toraeta shashinka no me: Sengo shashin no ayumi o tadoru. Tokyo: Asahi Shinbunsha, 1989.
 A Collection of Japanese Photographs, 1912–1940. Tokyo: Shashinkosha, 1990.
 Matsumoto Norihiko sakuhin-ten: Nissei gekijō 1964–1971. Tokyo: JCII Photo Salon, 1995.
 Shashinka no kontakuto tanken: Ichimai no meisaku wa dō ebareta ka. Tokyo: Heibonsha, 1996.
 Monokurōmu shashin no miryoku. Tonbo no Hon. Tokyo: Shinchōsha, 1998. With Tsuneo Enari.
 Nihon no bijutsukan to shashin korekushon. Kyoto: Tankōsha, 2002.
 Koshiji Fubuki: Ai no sanka = Fubuki Koshiji: Hymne à l'amour. Kyoto: Tankōsha, 2003.
 Shimanami Norumandī "futatsu no toshi" shashinten: Matsumoto Norihiko: Shimanami kaidō 10-shūnen kinen. Onomichi, Hiroshima: Onomichi City Museum of Art, 2009.
 Toki o kizanda shashin: Hozon ga nozomareru firumu. Tokyo: JCII Photo Salon, 2011.
 Shitte imasuka ... Hiroshima Nagasaki no genshi bakudan: Hibaku kara 70-nen. Tokyo: JCII Photo Salon, 2015.

References

Japanese photographers
1936 births
Living people
People from Onomichi, Hiroshima
Japanese writers
Photography critics
Historians of photography
Artists from Hiroshima Prefecture
Nihon University alumni